Good Times is the fifth solo studio album by Charlie Robison, released on September 21, 2004. It is his seventh album, overall, including a live album, appropriately titled Live, as well as a collaborate effort with Jack Ingram and Charlie's brother, Bruce Robison, titled Unleashed Live. Good Times peaked at No. 52 on the Billboard Top Country Albums chart.

Critical reception

Ronnie D. Lankford, Jr. of AllMusic says, "Robison isn't a mainstream country singer, but seems like he's playing country music because it's part of who he is and how he thinks, not because a friend loaned him a George Jones album in college."

Hank Kalet of PopMatters rates this album a 7 and writes, "Throughout, there is an ominous shadow cast that makes the good times seem a desperate attempt to keep away the blues. There is sadness and there are good times and they mingle, inform each other, change each other."

Christopher Gray of The Austin Chronicle gives the album 4 stars and says, "Good Times is darker and mellower than 2001's Life of the Party, but only because there's no song told by a brawling Irishman."

Track listing

Musicians

Charlie Robison – acoustic guitars, vocals, harmony vocals
Keith Robinson – drums, percussion
Scott Esbeck – bass guitar
Riley Osbourn – keyboards
David Grissom – guitars
Eamon McLoughlin – fiddle
Glenn Fukunaga – doghouse bass
Chip Dolan – accordion
Rich Brotherton – mandolin
Ted Roddy – harmonica
Lloyd Maines – steel guitar, dobro, papoose, lap steel guitar
Natalie Maines – backing vocals

Production
Producer – Charlie Robison
Producer – Lloyd Maines
Engineer – Billy C. "Cris" Burns
Additional engineering – James Calloway

Track information and credits adapted the album's liner notes.

Charts

References

2004 albums